Sciota obscurella is a species of snout moth. It is found in China (Yunnan).

References

Moths described in 1937
Phycitini
Moths of Asia
Taxa named by Aristide Caradja